Weissinger is a surname of German origin. Notable people with the name include:

George Weissinger Smith (1864–1931), Mayor of Louisville, Kentucky (United States) from 1917 to 1921
Patrick Weissinger (born 1973), German polo player and coach
René Weissinger (born 1978), German cyclist

References

Surnames of German origin